"A rising tide lifts all boats" is an aphorism associated with the idea that an improved economy will benefit all participants and that economic policy, particularly government economic policy, should therefore focus on broad economic efforts.

Origins
The phrase is commonly attributed to John F. Kennedy, who used it in a 1963 speech to combat criticisms that a dam project he was inaugurating was a pork barrel project. However, in his 2009 memoir Counselor: A Life At The Edge Of History, Kennedy's speechwriter, Ted Sorensen, revealed that the phrase was not one of his or the President's own fashioning. It was in Sorensen's first year working for him, during Kennedy's tenure in the Senate, while Sorensen was trying to tackle economic problems in New England, that he happened upon the phrase. He wrote that he noticed that "the regional chamber of commerce, the New England Council, had a thoughtful slogan: 'A rising tide lifts all the boats.'" From then on, Kennedy would borrow the slogan often. Sorensen highlighted that as an example of quotes mistakenly attributed to Kennedy.

In subsequent decades, the phrase has been used to defend tax cuts and other policies in which the initial beneficiaries are high-income earners.

In addition, the phrase (水涨船高) has been used in the Chinese language for centuries and first appeared in The Gallant Maid (兒女英雄傳), a novel by Wen Kang, a Manchu-born Qing dynasty author.

Meaning
The expression also applies to free-market policies, in that comparative-advantage production and subsequent trade would theoretically increase incomes for all participating entities. It is said to be a favorite proverb of former U.S. Treasury Secretary Robert Rubin.

However, the term has also been used in recent years to highlight economic inequality. Gene Sperling, Bill Clinton's former economic advisor, has opined that, in the absence of appropriate policies, "the rising tide will lift some boats, but others will run aground." British Labour MP Ed Miliband said at a party conference that “they used to say a rising tide lifted all boats. Now the rising tide just seems to lift the yachts.” New Zealand Labour MP David Parker has stated that "We believe that a rising tide of economic growth should lift all boats, not just the super yachts."

See also 

 Grow the Pie (phrase)
 Supply-side economics

References

External links 

English phrases
Economics catchphrases
Political catchphrases
1963 neologisms
Speeches by John F. Kennedy
Aphorisms
Economic liberalism